Richard Romney Sedgwick (29 May 1894 – 20 January 1972) was a British historian, civil servant and diplomat. He was the elder son of Professor Adam Sedgwick, 1854–1913, and Laura Helen Elizabeth Robinson. He married Mana St David Hodson, daughter of Professor T.C.Hodson, in 1936; they had one son and one daughter.

Sedgwick was educated at Westminster School and Trinity College, Cambridge. He became a Fellow of the college in 1919.

He edited The History of Parliament volumes that covered the House of Commons during the years 1715–1754. His work and that of his collaborators demonstrated that the Whig and Tory parties survived Queen Anne's death in 1714 and continued to exist during the reigns of George I and George II.

Eveline Cruickshanks, in her work on the Tories and the Jacobite rising of 1745, paid tribute to Sedgwick: "My greatest debt is to the late Romney Sedgwick, a staunch Whig, whose wit and erudition I greatly admired, for a series of discussions, heated at times, but, as I well know, much enjoyed on both sides".

Works
‘The Inner Cabinet from 1739 to 1741’, English Historical Review 34 (1919), pp. 290–302.
John, Lord Hervey, Some Materials towards Memoirs of the Reign of King George II (editor, 3 volumes, 1931).
‘Sir Robert Walpole 1676–1745: The Minister for the House of Commons’, Times Literary Supplement (24 March 1945), pp. 133–134.
The House of Commons 1715–1754 (editor, 2 volumes, 1970).

Notes

1890s births
1972 deaths
20th-century British historians